Nyandarua County  is a County in the former Central Province of Kenya. Its capital and largest town is Ol Kalou. Formerly the capital was Nyahururu, which is now part of the Laikipia County. Nyandarua County has population of 596,268  and an area of 3,304 km2. The  county is located on the northwestern part of the old Central Province, and contains the Aberdare Ranges.

The county was split into two in 2007: Nyandarua North District and Nyandarua South District. However, with the promulgation in 2010 of new constitution, these have been re-organised as sub counties of Nyandarua County . Daniel Waithaka was elected the first governor of the County 2013 General Election and Francis Kimemia seconds him in August 2017 elections. In the 2022 general elections, Moses Ndirangu Badilisha won the sit, becoming the third Governor of Nyandarua County.

Demographics

Administrative divisions

Constituencies 
The county has five constituencies and 25 wards

Health 
Nyandarua is serviced by several government hospitals; Nyahururu, Ngano. Ol Kalou -JM Kariuki Memorial district hospital, Engineer District Hospital. Mission hospital funded by church and NGO, Dispensary i.e.Mirangine Health Centre and numbers of private hospital.

County hospitals receive patients from all over the county and in case of referral refer them to Nakuru or Nyeri County Referral hospital and then to Kenyatta National Hospital

Representatives 
The county is represented by 25 elected ward representatives 5 MPs, a Women representative, a Senator and a Governor.

In 2013 presidential election the county voters voted for Uhuru Kenyatta with 237,975 a 99% of valid votes.

In the 2022 general elections, majority of the voters voted for William Samoei Ruto with 189, 513 votes,  78.76% of valid votes.

August

Members of County Assembly (In reference to August 2022 general elections)

Legislature 
Current Members of parliament from constituencies in the county are;

There were three candidates for governorship during 2013 election

2022 General election. 
Moses Kiarie  Ndirangu Badilisha and John Mathara Mwangi won the 2022 election on a United Democratic Alliance ticket both being sworn in on the  AUGUST 25TH, 2022 AT THE OL’KALOU ARBORETUM GROUNDS as Governor and Deputy  Governor of Nyandarua County respectively.

John Methu was elected Senator through United Democratic Alliance with 185,337 votes against Theuri Kinyanjui who had 34,845 votes and the former Senator Mwangi Paul Githiomi came in third with15,015 votes.

Faith Gitau of the United Democratic Alliance won and retained her seat by 159,621 votes against her competitors Esther Muhoho of  the Jubilee Party with 40,112 and followed closely by Judy Muhia with 27,819 votes.

In constituency level, Kinangop Constituency saw Mr Kwenya Thuku retain his seat by the Jubilee Party won by 39,321 votes against Chege Mugo who garnered 34, 842 votes and vied in the United Democratic Alliance party, Ol Kalou Constituency Hon. Kiaraho, David Njuguna retained his seat with the Jubilee Party having gained 24,058 votes against United Democratic Alliance contender Sammy Ngotho, who received 19,380 votes. In Kipipiri Constituency they made history by electing the first female Member Of Parliament Wanjiku Muhia who was also the First Women Representative for Nyandarua County. Jeremiah Kioni Jubilee Secretary lost his seat of ten years to George Gachagwa of United Democratic Alliance. George who got 30,180 votes against Kioni who had 7,227 votes in the Ndaragwa Constituency.

Education 
Children in Nyandarua can access school with ease. Schools are normally situated a walking distance mostly of less than 3 km (for primary school and high school) with a large number of public and private schools. For tertiary education they are a number of colleges and polytechnic but no university.

Education levels vary drastically with 61% of the population having reached primary school, 19% secondary school and only 2% have a tertiary education level.

One of pioneer school is Nyandarua high School which was opened 29 March 1965 with 71 students. Currently they are other major school among others; Kangui high School, Karima Girls, Shamata Girls, Wanjohi Girls, Magumu, Mukoe, Kagondo, Kihingo, Waka Junior, Njabini, Nyahururu Boys. There has been no University in Nyandarua, until Nyandarua Institute was upgraded to a university college under Dedan Kimathi University of Science & Technology. There are some Technical Institutions like Leshau Polytechnic in Ndaragwa Constituency, at Gordon Centre (Next to Kihingo Catholic Church) – Mutanga Parish And Kinagop Technical and Vocational centre in Githioro (kinagop sub county) which was launched on 2017. More Tertiary institution are needed.

Investment challenges 

Nyandarua County is a productive area for agriculture, manufacturing and processing. There are a number of challenges including lack of a good road network and adequate distribution of electricity and water.

Interested investors both local and in the diaspora can invest in agriculture, manufacturing, processing and housing.

Nyandarua county is famous for its agricultural productivity. Agricultural produce in terms of Maize, Beans, Irish potatoes, cabbages, spinach, kales, peas, grow in plenty, due to the fertile soils and favourable climate in the county.

Sport 
Nyandarua is famous for being the home of athletics such as; John Ngugi, Catherine Ndereba, Stanley Waithaka and the late Samuel Wanjiru (a one-time Olympic champion, three-time major marathon winner, one-time major marathon silver medalist, and two-time world record holder).
It is also home to Benson Kariuki and Bernard Ndung'u, who are Kenya Bowling Federation champions both in Africa and globally. The county is also famous for organising cross country races at different administrative levels in attempt to nurture young athletes.

Economy 
The main economic activity in Nyandarua is farming (crop cultivation and dairy farming). In late 1990s Nyandarua was a leading producer of pyrethrum, however Kenya Pyrethrum Board the parastatal that was given the role of purchasing, processing and marketing the crop collapsed because of poor management and corruption, severely undermining the livelihood of many farmers. Nyandarua county is well known as a giant in potato farming. However, there has been a number of challenges that are associated with farming such as fluctuation of the market, poor roads, and crop diseases. Aberdare forest which covers a larger area of the country, attract local and international tourist who make a positive income to the local society.
The time is now ripe for the people of Nyandarua to initiate new ways of Agribusiness. Constituencies like Ndaragwa should initiate Agribusiness that does well in semi arid areas like mangoes, millet, cassava, pumpkins and other such crops. A processing factory should be established so that the farmers would get maximum returns.

Tourism 
Nyandarua county is famous for various tourism destination sites attracting both local and international tourists. This include the  Aberdare National Park, Mount Kipipiri, Lake Ol Bolossat, Kinangop Plateau and Elephant Hill Hiking Trail.

Central Kenya Region

Urbanisation

Wealth and poverty level

References

External links 
Nyandarua Coun

 
Counties of Kenya

ty